Beta-defensin 126 is a protein that in humans is encoded by the DEFB126 gene.

Function 

Defensins are cysteine-rich cationic polypeptides that are important in the immunologic response to invading microorganisms. The protein encoded by this gene is secreted and is a member of the beta defensin protein family. Beta defensin genes are found in several clusters throughout the genome, with this gene mapping to a cluster at 20p13. The encoded protein is highly similar to an epididymal-specific secretory protein (ESP13.2) from cynomolgus monkey.

It has been suggested that a common variation in the DEFB126 gene generates abnormal mRNA and can somewhat impair fertility.

References

Further reading